{{speciesbox
|image = Nuxia floribunda.jpg
|image_caption = Foliage and inflorescences
|genus = Nuxia
|species = floribunda
|status = LC
|status_system = IUCN3.1
|status_ref = 
|authority = Benth.
|synonyms =
Lachnopylis polyantha (Gilg) C.A.Sm. 
Nuxia floribunda var. holstii Gilg   
Nuxia holstii (Gilg) Gilg
Nuxia polyantha  Gilg    Nuxia usambarensis Gilg  Nuxia volkensii Gilg  
}}Nuxia floribunda'', the forest elder, forest nuxia or wild elder, is a species of tree in the Stilbaceae family, that is native to moist regions of southern Africa, East Africa and central tropical Africa.

Habit
It usually grows to between 3 and 10 metres tall, although it occasionally may grow as tall as 25 metres. It has a crooked trunk, rough flaking bark and a rounded canopy. Large panicles of sweetly scented small white to cream flowers are produced from autumn to spring.

Range and habitat
The species is native to southern and eastern Africa, from South Africa, through Eswatini, Zimbabwe, Mozambique, Zambia, Malawi, Tanzania, Burundi, Rwanda, eastern Democratic Republic of the Congo, to Uganda and Kenya.

It is a characteristic species of undifferentiated Afromontane forest in southern and eastern Africa.

References

Stilbaceae
Trees of South Africa
Flora of Zimbabwe
Flora of Mozambique
Afromontane flora